Jennifer Sandra Carroll (née Johnson, August 27, 1959) is a Trinidadian–American Republican politician and retired naval officer who served as the 18th lieutenant governor of Florida from January 4, 2011 to March 12, 2013. Carroll is the first black person, woman and Trinidadian-American elected to the office; she also is the first black person elected to statewide office in Florida since Reconstruction. Carroll previously served as a Republican member of the Florida House of Representatives. She is the bestselling author of an autobiography entitled When You Get There.

While lieutenant governor, Carroll came under scrutiny for public relations work for a charity that involved itself in gambling and for $24,000 in income that she failed to report on financial disclosures and tax returns. At the request of Governor Rick Scott, Carroll resigned her post as lieutenant governor on March 12, 2013. The Florida Department of Law Enforcement subsequently concluded that she had not broken any laws.

Early life, education, and career

Carroll was born in Port of Spain, Trinidad and Tobago. She moved to the United States at the age of eight, and graduated from Uniondale High School in Uniondale, Long Island New York in 1977. She enlisted in the U.S. Navy in 1979. After serving as an aviation machinist's mate (jet engine mechanic), she was selected for the Enlisted Commissioning Program, becoming an Aviation Maintenance Duty Officer in 1985. She retired from the U.S. Navy in 1999 as a lieutenant commander.

In 1981, she received an Associate of Arts degree from Leeward Community College. She followed this in 1985 with a Bachelor of Arts in political science from the University of New Mexico. She moved to Florida in 1986. She received a Master of Business Administration degree from unaccredited and now defunct Kensington University in 1995. Carroll resigned her position on the National Commission of Presidential Scholars to accept a presidential appointment to the Veterans' Disability Benefits Commission. She then returned to school to earn an accredited Master of Business Administration degree online from St. Leo University in 2008.

Following the 2000 elections, Carroll was appointed Executive Director of the Florida Department of Veterans Affairs by Republican Governor Jeb Bush and served in that post until July 2002. Republican President George W. Bush appointed Carroll to the Commission on Presidential Scholars from 2001 to 2004, and then a seat on the Veterans' Disability Benefits Commission from 2004 to 2007.

Political career

Carroll is a member of the Clay County Republican Executive Committee. In 2000, she ran for a seat in the U.S. House of Representatives in the Florida's 3rd congressional district. Incumbent Democratic U.S. Congresswoman Corrine Brown defeated Carroll 58%–42%. After redistricting, she ran for a rematch against Brown in the newly redrawn 3rd district in 2002. Brown defeated her 59%–41%.

Carroll is one of the founders of Maggie's List, a federal PAC that supports conservative female candidates.

Florida House of Representatives
Carroll ran for a seat Florida House of Representatives in the 13th state House district after incumbent State Representative Mike Hogan, also a Republican, resigned in 2003. In the April 2003 special election, she won the Republican primary with 65.5 percent of the vote, defeating Linda Sparks, who won 34.5 percent of the vote. She became the first Black female Republican ever elected to the Florida Legislature. She won unopposed in 2004, 2006, and 2008.

Carroll was appointed Deputy Majority Leader from 2003–2004, and served as Majority Whip in 2004–2006. She was Vice Chair of the Transportation and Economic Development Committee (2003–2004), Chair of the Finance Committee (2006–2008) and Chair of the Economic and Development Council (2008–2010).

Lieutenant Governor of Florida
On November 2, 2010, the Republican ticket of Rick Scott and Jennifer Carroll defeated the Democratic ticket of Alex Sink and Rod Smith, 48.9%–47.7%. The first black person, the first woman, and the first Trinidadian American elected to the position, she assumed the office on January 4, 2011. Carroll was the first black Republican elected to statewide office in Florida since Reconstruction.

She had a troubled relationship with Governor Scott concerning various charges of office mismanagement, which included retaliation on staff, tax improprieties and lesbianism.

Carroll came under further scrutiny for public relations work for a charity that involved itself in illegal online gambling and for $24,000 in income which she failed to report on disclosures and tax returns. Though the Ethics Committee found no evidence of wrongdoing, at the request of Governor Rick Scott, Carroll resigned her post as lieutenant governor on March 12, 2013. The Florida Department of Law Enforcement subsequently concluded that she did not break any laws.

Later political career
Carroll served as a surrogate for Donald Trump during his 2016 presidential campaign, speaking at his rallies and serving on his National Diversity Council. In December 2017, President Trump appointed Carroll as a Commissioner on the American Battle Monuments Commission. Carroll served on the Commission from April 2018 until January 2021.

Personal life
Carroll's husband is Nolan Carroll, a retired senior master sergeant in the United States Air Force. Together, the Carrolls have three children. Carroll's son, Nolan Carroll II, has played football at the collegiate and professional levels.

See also
 List of female lieutenant governors in the United States
 List of minority governors and lieutenant governors in the United States

References

External links

Project Vote Smart profile
Profile, Florida House of Representatives website; accessed November 6, 2014.

1959 births
Living people
Lieutenant Governors of Florida
Republican Party members of the Florida House of Representatives
State cabinet secretaries of Florida
Kensington University alumni
Women state legislators in Florida
Saint Leo University alumni
University of New Mexico alumni
People from Port of Spain
Trinidad and Tobago emigrants to the United States
Female United States Navy officers
People from Uniondale, New York
People from Clay County, Florida
Military personnel from Florida
Writers from Florida
Donald Trump 2016 presidential campaign
21st-century American women writers
21st-century American politicians
21st-century American women politicians
African-American female military personnel
African-American state legislators in Florida
African-American women in politics
21st-century African-American women
20th-century African-American people
20th-century African-American women
African-American United States Navy personnel
Black conservatism in the United States
Leeward Community College alumni